Red Hen may refer to:

 The Little Red Hen, a folk tale
 Red Hen Press, American publisher founded in 1984
 Red Hen restaurant controversy in Lexington, Virginia (2018)
 Red Hen Systems, American technology company founded in 1997
 Red rail, an extinct bird

 South Australian Railways Redhen railcar, Australian railcar built between 1955 and 1971
 A 1980s UK restaurant chain at Welcome_Break service stations